The Quest of the Historical Muhammad may refer to:
 The Quest of the Historical Muhammad (Peters), by Francis Edwards Peters
 The Quest of the Historical Muhammad (Jeffery), by Arthur Jeffery
 The Quest for the Historical Muhammad (Ibn Warraq), by Ibn Warraq